Reggane (from Berber "Argan") is a town and commune, and the capital of Reggane District, in Adrar Province, central Algeria. Reggane lies in the Sahara Desert near an oasis. According to the 2008 census it has a population of 20,402, up from 14,179 in 1998, with an annual growth rate of 3.8%. Berber tribes and people live in and around Reggane.

History

To the east of Reggane there was, until 1965, a rocket launching site where numerous civilian and military ballistic rockets were launched. France began its nuclear testing program in the vicinity of Reggane, conducting four such tests during the Algerian War in 1960 and 1961, before independence.

Geography
The town of Reggane and its neighbouring villages lie next to the southernmost oasis of the Tuat region, which stretches northward to Adrar. The Tidikelt region, a plain with isolated oases, lies to the east, including towns such as In Salah, In Ghar, Aoulef and Tit. To the west is the sandy Erg Chech desert, while to the south lies the vast barren plain of the Tanezrouft.

Climate 

Reggane has a hot desert climate (Köppen climate classification BWh), with long, extremely hot summers and short, very warm winters. The climate is torrid and almost rainless. Daytime temperatures are known to consistently approach 50 °C (122 °F) in summer and nighttime temperatures routinely remain above 30 °C (86 °F). Average annual rainfall is extremely low, with only 10 mm (0.39 in). The sky is always clear throughout the year and the sunshine reigns supreme. The area in the heart of the Algerian Desert bounded by Adrar - Reggane - In Salah is nicknamed the "triangle of fire" by local inhabitants due to the extreme heat that bakes the region from May to September.

Transportation

Reggane is the last town on the Tanezrouft track heading south across the Sahara Desert to Mali. Customs and police inspection here are mandatory before crossing the Sahara Desert. The Tanezrouft track is the southern part of Algeria's N6 national highway, which connects to Adrar to the north and Bordj Badji Mokhtar to the south. Another highway, the N52, leads through the Tidikelt region to Aoulef and eventually In Salah.

Education

6.0% of the population has a tertiary education, and another 15.6% has completed secondary education. The overall literacy rate is 75.9%, and is 85.0% among males and 66.3% among females.

Localities
As of 1984, the commune was composed of 11 localities:

Bahou
El Mestour
Zaouit Lahchef
Anzeglouf
Aït Massaoud
En Nefis
Timadanine
Taarabt
Tinoufel Djedida
Tinoufel Elgadima
Zaouit Reggani
Taourirt
Berriche

See also

Gerboise Bleue - France's first nuclear bomb, tested at Reggane

References

External links
Reggane Chronology and Launch Log
Description of Reggane and the Tanezrouft Track (in French)
French nuclear tests in the Sahara (video)

Neighbouring towns and cities

Communes of Adrar Province
Nuclear test sites
French nuclear test sites
Spaceports
Cities in Algeria